The Temple of Anahita (Middle Persian: Ādur-Anāhīd) was an ancient fire temple in Istakhr dedicated to the worship of the Iranian goddess Anahid.

History 

The temple was probably founded by the Achaemenid king of kings Artaxerxes II, who had shrines and statues of her constructed throughout his realm. The temple was ransacked by the Macedonians during Alexander the Great's conquests. At the start of the 3rd century AD, the temple was repaired and adorned by the Persian Sasanian family, who acted as the hereditary caretakers of the temple; Sasan, the eponymous ancestor of the family, is the first attested member to serve as the warden of the temple. The guardianship of the temple was of high importance to the Sasanians. 

Ardashir I, who overthrew the Parthian Empire and established the Sasanian control over the country, reportedly sent the heads of his enemies in his early campaigns to the temple, which was later repeated by Shapur II, who had the heads of Christians stringed there in 340. Under Bahram II, the crown lost much of its religious authority, with the Zoroastrian priest Kartir receiving the guardianship of the Anahid temple. Narseh, who overthrew Bahram II's son and successor Bahram III in 293, may have restored the temple to their family. By Shapur II's reign, however, the Sasanian hold over the temple was certainly restored.

The last Sasanian emperor of Iran, Yazdegerd III, was crowned in the Anahid temple in 632.

References

Sources

Further reading
 

Fire temples in Iran
Achaemenid architecture
Sasanian architecture
Anahita
Istakhr